VFA-82, Strike Fighter Squadron 82, known as the Marauders was a U.S. Navy strike fighter squadron formerly based at MCAS Beaufort, South Carolina, established in 1967 and deactivated in 2005. Its radio callsign was Streetcar.

History
Attack Squadron 82 (VA-82) was established on 1 May 1967 as a light attack squadron flying the Vought A-7A Corsair II.

The Marauders made their first deployment aboard  during her maiden cruise to the waters off North Vietnam in April 1968.  They returned to Southeast Asia in September 1969 aboard .

The Marauders transitioned to the A-7E in August 1970, but in late spring of 1972, VA-82 was forced to revert to the A-7C due to unexpected problems with the A-7E's TF-41 engines. The Marauders then deployed from June 1972 to March 1973 aboard USS America for a ten-month combat cruise.

On that deployment, VA-82 played a role in the attack that destroyed the Thanh Hoa Bridge, a vital link in the North Vietnamese Army supply lines and a target that seemed indestructible during the Vietnam War. Four A-7Cs from VA-82 successfully delivered  of high explosives with two planes carrying two  Walleyes, while two other carried two, 2,000 lb Mk 84 bombs. In a simultaneous attack, the centre piling on the bridge was hit, and the span broke in half. After this, the Thanh Hoa bridge was considered permanently destroyed and removed from the target list.

The squadron made several deployments to the Mediterranean during the 1970s, and while doing so received many of the Navy's most prestigious awards including the Wade McClusky Award as most outstanding attack squadron and Battle "E" in 1976.  In 1975 the Marauders deployed aboard  on her maiden cruise.

The squadron completed its last cruise with the A-7E Corsair II in June 1987. On July 13, 1987, VA-82 was redesignated Strike Fighter Squadron 82 (VFA-82).  With the delivery of the first aircraft in November 1987, VFA-82 became the first F/A-18C squadron.

In 1990, VFA-82 escorted  around the horn of South America on its way to Philadelphia, Pennsylvania for modernization.  December 1990 found VFA-82 once again aboard USS America, participating in Operation Desert Shield and Operation Desert Storm.  The Marauders flew 597 combat sorties, 1308.9 combat hours and delivered over 1.2 million pounds of ordnance over Iraq. In December 1993, the Marauders returned to USS America for a six-month deployment during which VFA-82 participated in Operation Southern Watch in Iraq, Operation Deny Flight and Operation Sharp Guard in Bosnia and Operation Restore Hope in Somalia.

From August 1995 to February 1996, the Marauders joined USS America for her last cruise. From October 1997 through April 1998, the squadron deployed on board  to the Mediterranean Sea and Persian Gulf in support of Operation Southern Watch. During 1998 the Marauders operated from the decks of three U.S. aircraft carriers and visited seven countries. In August 1999, the Marauders bid farewell to NAS Cecil Field and relocated to NAS Jacksonville for the two months prior to deployment.  In September 1999, the Marauders deployed on board  in support of Operation Southern Watch. Upon completion of the six-month deployment on board "Big John," the Marauders relocated to their new home, MCAS Beaufort, South Carolina in March 2000.

Following the September 11, 2001 attacks, the Marauders deployed on September 18, steaming for the Arabian Sea and Afghanistan. The Marauders returned to Beaufort on March 28, 2002. The squadron had logged an unprecedented 159 days continuously deployed, the majority of which were combat operations.

During the latter half of 2002, the squadron trained against F-16 Falcons in Burlington, Vermont, and at one point were detached to Roosevelt Roads Naval Station, Puerto Rico; NAS Fallon; and NAS Key West.  During the NAS Key West detachment, Marauders pilots had the opportunity to fly against German Air Force MiG-29s. VFA-82 was disestablished effective September 30, 2005 in accordance with a directive issued on July 5, 2005.

See also
History of the United States Navy
List of inactive United States Navy aircraft squadrons
List of United States Navy aircraft squadrons

References

External links
http://dodssp.daps.mil/Directives/notices/3111_135.pdf - directive disestablishing VFA-82
http://mashable.com/2016/02/05/another-vietnam-photography/ - picture of a VA-82 plane downed in Vietnam 

Strike fighter squadrons of the United States Navy